The Jewish Voice (TJV) is a conservative weekly newspaper based in Brooklyn, New York, that was founded in 2003 as The Sephardic Voice. The Jewish Voice has a pro-Israel editorial outlook. It covers Israeli and American news (the latter focused on New York, and to a lesser extent New Jersey and Florida). The paper describes its mission as "providing our readers with timely and thought-provoking news and opinion, from a pro-American, pro-Israel perspective."

Staff, writers, and focus

The Jewish Voice'''s founder and publisher is David Ben Hooren. He is a Syrian Jew and a member of the New York Syrian Sephardic Jewish community. OP-ed contributors include such conservative voices as Jerusalem Post columnist and editor Caroline Glick, former UN Ambassador John Bolton, and British journalist Melanie Phillips, among others. According to Right Wing Watch, after far-right activist Laura Loomer was banned from Twitter for posting racist and Islamophobic content, she reportedly evaded her block by using Jewish Voice's Twitter account.

In March 2020, the paper reported 100 positive COVID-19 tests in Hasidic communities located in Borough Park and Williamsburg. The paper urged compliance with mask-wearing, social distancing, and other health guidelines during COVID-19 pandemic in New York City. Hooren reported that many Orthodox Jews felt "singled out" and targeted with the enforcement of the restrictions.The Jewish Voice'' primarily focuses on New York City news, society, and culture as well as Israeli news. The newspaper played an instrumental role in the election of Republican Bob Turner for United States Representative for New York's 9th congressional district in 2011. They also endorsed David Storobin, Marty Golden, and Eric Ulrich for New York State Senate in 2012. The paper endorsed Mitt Romney in the 2012 Presidential election, and Donald J. Trump in the 2016 Presidential election.

References

External links
 The Jewish Voice Official Website

Jewish newspapers published in the United States
Jews and Judaism in New York City
Newspapers published in Brooklyn
Weekly newspapers published in the United States
2003 establishments in New York (state)
Publications established in 2003
Conservative media in the United States